The bronzed cutworm or shaded Umber moth (Nephelodes minians) is a moth of the family Noctuidae. It is found in most of North America, except Florida and adjacent states.

This wingspan is about 40 mm. The moth flies from July to October depending on the location.

The larva feeds on various grasses, including cereal crops and corn.

Subspecies
There are three recognised subspecies:
Nephelodes minians minians
Nephelodes minians tertialis
Nephelodes minians pectinata

External links
butterfliesandmoths.org
Bug Guide

Hadeninae
Moths of North America